The Penn State Nittany Lions men's soccer team is an intercollegiate varsity sports team of Pennsylvania State University. The team is a member of the Big Ten Conference of the National Collegiate Athletic Association. Penn State's intercollegiate soccer program began in 1911 and has won or shared 11 national championships and 6 conference tournament championships. In 1959, the team joined the National Collegiate Athletic Association when it added men's soccer to its program and in 1987 joined the Atlantic 10 Conference as a charter member. At the conclusion of its 1990 season the Nittany Lions joined the Big Ten Conference where they play today.

Penn State is currently a member of the Big Ten Conference and a participating school in its men's soccer league. The men's soccer team joined the Big Ten in the conference's first year of collegiate soccer play, 1991. The league comprises Penn State, Indiana, Iowa, Maryland, Michigan, Michigan State, Northwestern, Ohio State, Rutgers and Wisconsin. While participating in the league Penn State has currently won three Big Ten Men's Soccer Tournament championships, made it to 12 tournament finals, and finished first in the conference table winning the regular season four times.

History

Team Formation

The formation of a men's soccer program at Pennsylvania State University began with the first soccer match played at the university in 1910. The game, an interclass exhibition match played at that years commencement track meet, was between teams made up of students in the classes of 1910 and 1912 against students in the classes of 1911 and 1913. The match ended in a 0–0 draw but helped propel the demand for future soccer competition at the university. Penn State's athletic director and head football coach Pop Golden announced in May 1911 he would support any interclass games with the presentation of a trophy to the winning team. With popularity growing, another interclass game was played on New Beaver Field in June 1911 between the classes of 1913 and 1914. These games would eventually turn into the creation of an interclass league at the university, helping grow the sport's popularity on campus.

An official Penn State varsity soccer team was introduced in December 1911 with the of scheduling three road matches facing intercollegiate national champion Haverford College, as well as Westtown School and the University of Pennsylvania. At the time Penn State was one of only 17 varsity sponsored soccer teams fielded across the United States.

Fielding a 14-man roster and being coached by a student manager the Nittany Lions set off for Philadelphia to debut in December 1911. Lacking university funds for the trip equipment and trip costs were paid with a $100 donation from Penn State alumnus James G. White. The Nittany Lions played their inaugural match on December 19, 1911, against the previous year's national champion Haverford College, the squad fell 3–2. The team finished the road series drawing their matches against Westtown School 1–1 on December 20 and University of Pennsylvania 0–0 on December 21.

The Nittany Lion's abandoned their 1917 Fall season after one match was played due to the United States entering World War I.

Bill Jeffrey era
From the late 1920s into the late 1940s Penn State was noted as one of the top college soccer programs in the United States. Leading the team from the 1920s to the 1960s was head coach Bill Jeffrey who was able to accumulate ten national championship wins, a record  138 wins and a 65-game unbeaten streak. Jeffrey was inducted to the National Soccer Hall of Fame in 1951 for his coaching performance and help growing the game of soccer in the United States. The highest success of Penn State's soccer program as well as college soccer of the era was seen under Jeffrey. While head coach Jeffrey lead the Nittany Lions on multiple international tours where they played professional and semiprofessional sides.

Intercollegiate Soccer Football Association

An application was submitted to the Intercollegiate Soccer Football Association to join the Intercollegiate Soccer League in May 1914. At the time of petition Penn State and Princeton were being considered by the association to become league members. Inevitably, Princeton received an invitation to join the league while and Penn State was left waiting. Penn State continued to petition the Intercollegiate Soccer Football Association with no success.

At the beginning of the 1926 season the Intercollegiate Soccer League was dissolved. Penn State, who had waited 12 years to join the league, was extended an invitation to be a part of a reinvention of former league, now called the Intercollegiate Soccer Football Association. The Intercollegiate Soccer Football Association was created as a broader organization and governing body that would serve as a support a for collegiate soccer across the country.

Receiving an invitation to join the association alongside Penn State were Lehigh, Army, Lafayette, Navy, Colgate, Dartmouth, Williams, Amherst, Wesleyan and all six former members of the Intercollegiate Soccer League. Under the new rules of the association Penn State would be required to play four members of the organization during each season. Instead of a league title, national championships would be awarded by the association at the end of each season. In their first season in the new association the Nittany Lions were crowned Co-National Champions by the Intercollegiate Soccer Football Association along with Princeton and Haverford. The team was the only in the league to remain undefeated.

At the conclusion of the 1930 season, at the annual Intercollegiate Soccer Football Association meeting, it was announced the single league would be replaced by the formation of two leagues new leagues the Middle Atlantic league and New England league. The initial plan put forward by the association was to create two or three leagues that would all separately compete for its own championship cup. This initial motion was voted down by the committee 13–9, but another motion to recognize the New England and Middle Atlantic leagues passed unanimously. The Middle Atlantic League was to be made up for Penn, Princeton, Cornell, Haverford, Swarthmore and Lehigh and the New England League was to be made up of Yale, Harvard and Dartmouth. These two leagues would compete amongst one another with the association selecting a national champion at the end of each season.

It was announced Penn State would continue to be a member of the Intercollegiate Soccer Football Association but was no longer a member of its sanctioned league and would not be eligible for a championship in either league. The reasoning for not admitted Penn State to either of the two new leagues was the university's location. Penn State was not located in either geographical districts that had been set out by the association.

After their dismissal from the league, Penn State and a group of remaining members not admitted petitioned the association to create a third league. Penn State along with the remaining active members Syracuse and Navy as well as the associate members Temple, Western Maryland and Bucknell asked to form a third league, the Eastern League.

Scotland Trip
The Nittany Lions engaged in a tour of six pre-season exhibition matches in Scotland through 6 weeks during August and September 1934. The team was invited to compete with amateur sides by the Scottish Amateur Football Association becoming the first American soccer team schedule a Scottish tour. The trip was officially sanctioned by the American Amateur Football Association and approved by the Intercollegiate Soccer Football Association. The matches were scheduled by officials at Leith Athletic F.C. Six of team the Nittany Lion's faced had captured a National Amatur Championship in Scotland. The Nittany Lions set sail for Scotland on August 11 of 1934 aboard the RMS Cameronia.

Penn State was suspended for championship contention by the Intercollegiate Soccer Football Association in January 1935. The team was suspended for using players from other schools as well as a coach in their exhibition matches in Scotland. Penn State's head coach Bill Jeffrey defended its actions by stating players on the trip had become sick and there was a need for substitutes to prevent scheduled games from being canceled. The team was reinstated for the 1935 season championship and no other sanctions were put on the team.

Unbeaten Streak
Penn State holds the longest men's soccer collegiate unbeaten streaks at 65 games. The unbeaten streak spanned from 1932 to 1941 with the Nittany Lions claiming 60 wins and 5 draws. The streak started on November 5, 1932, in a match against Army that was won 2-1 and ended in a November 15, 1941 loss to Army. One of the most notable seasons was 1935, where the team had a perfect 7-0-0 record and conceded zero goals to opponents. At the end of the 1940 season the team had scored 250 goals while only allowing 31 goals. Citing the pressure to uphold the streak then head coach Bill Jeffrey told the Associated Press in 1940 a loss might be a good thing for the team after they had gone 61 games without a loss.

Title Denial
The Nittany Lions were denied the Eastern Intercollegiate Soccer Football Association in 1935 title due to the team not playing four active members of the ISFA, the team instead received an honorable mention by the association. Penn State's schedule originally featured four active members but Syracuse was later suspended for the 1935 season due to only playing 3 league contests in 1934. The team instead received an honorable mention by the association. As a fix to future scheduling issues the association removed its four active member game mandate and instead would choose a champion based on strength of schedule. This change also made every school actively participating in the association into an active member.

Trip to Iran

Arranged by the United States Department of State after an invitation by the Iranian Athletic Association for a diplomatic soccer tour of the country during the college's 1951 Easter break, the reigning 1950 National Champions Penn State were slated to play three goodwill games in Iran in the midst of the Cold War. Complications arose weeks before the Nittany Lions were set to start their tour when Iranian Prime Minister Haj Ali Razmara was assassinated. After safety consideration, the team and games were allowed to go ahead as planned.

The team consisted of head coach Bill Jeffrey, 15 players and a student manager. On March 21, 1951, the team flew from the U.S. to Shannon, Ireland, then to Paris, Geneva, and Damascus before landing in Tehran two days later on Friday, March 23. After arriving in Tehran, Iran the team made an official visit to the U.S. Embassy in Iran and met with U.S. ambassador to Iran, Dr. Henry F. Grady.

Their first match was played in Isfahan, Iran on March 24. An estimated crowd of 500 was waiting to greet the team while a line of soldiers restrained the crowd. As the team bus drove through the city, they were followed by bicyclists attempting to shake hands with the team. According to reports, one bicyclist was knocked down and killed under the wheels of a military truck. The Nittany Lions lost their first match 2–0 to the Isfahan club team in front of an estimated crowd of 5,000. After the match, spectators stormed the field celebrating both teams. The team's second match was played in Shiraz, Iran on March 25. The match began with an own-goal scored by a Shiraz player. Goals from Harold Irvin and Ronald Coleman claimed a 3–0 final. After the match, Penn State's goalkeeper Ron Coder was picked up and carried to the team bus in celebration by locals. Their final match was played in Tehran, Iran at Amjadieh Stadium against an Iranian all-star squad. The Nittany Lions fell to the group 5–0. The match was photographed and published as part of George W. Long's 1951 assignment for National Geographic entitled, “Journey Into Troubled Iran”. The team left Tehran, Iran on April 3.

Transitional Era
The Nittany Lions, coming off of back-to-back national titles, the retirement of its most prolific head coach William Jeffrey and a decade of collegiate soccer dominance fell in the 1960s and 1970s. The era was marked largely a transitional period for Penn State men's soccer.

Walter Bahr Era

Match against United States National Team
The United States men's national soccer team slated a tour against college and senior amateur teams in 1985 aimed to promote soccer and finalize selections for the 1986 FIFA World Cup. The Penn State Nittany Lion's faced off against the national team side at Jeffrey Field On April 26, 1985, at 7:30 p.m. in front of 1,500 fans. The match was the sixth and final played by the United States during their tour.

Penn State opened the scoring in the 27th minute with a strike from midfielder Troy Snyder to make the game 1–0. Shortly after the United States responded with a goal of their own in the 36th minute from midfielder Amr Aly to make the game 1-1. Penn State, making seven saves in the second half, preserved a 1–1 draw.

Head coach of the United States Alkis Panagoulias expressed pleasure with the competition Penn State provided. "I was very pleased to see a very good college team here. I think Walter Bahr is doing a good job here," Panagoulias shared after the match.

The U.S.A. Soccer National Team & PSU Coaching Legacy.

100 Years, 4 Generations of Penn State Coaching History

Coach Jeffrey was the head coach of Penn State University starting in the early 1920s and later became the Men's national team head coach in the world cup. Jeffrey died in 1966 with his coaching lineage working through four generations at Penn State University. The captain of Jeffrey's 1950 USA team, Walter Bahr coached at Penn State from 1974 to 1988. His assistant, Barry Gorman, later succeeded him as head coach, keeping the Penn State job through the 2009 season. In 2021, it is back in Altoona, Pennsylvania where the connection to Jeffrey continues. Coach Gorman's youth player, Fraser Kershaw, took the head coaching job at Penn State Altoona. The coaching connection reaches four separate generations of soccer, reaching a 100-year continual coaching succession.

Modern conference play

Atlantic 10 Conference
Penn State men's soccer, and other school sanctioned sports, joined the Atlantic 10 Conference in 1987 as a charter member of what was then called the Eastern Athletic Association and informally known as the Eastern 8. The league comprised Penn State, Rutgers, West Virginia, Duquesne, George Washington and UMass. While participating in the league Penn State won three Atlantic 10 Men's Soccer Tournament championships, made it to four tournament finals, and finished first in the conference table winning the regular season three times. After 4 seasons of play Penn State withdrew from the Atlantic 10 Conference at the conclusion of the 1990 season to join the Big Ten Conference.

Uniforms, crest and colors 
The Penn State Nittany Lions men's soccer team wears the school's navy and white colors and displays the same insignia on their uniforms as their fellow athletic teams. The team does not have a traditional crest, instead uses the Penn State wordmark across the chest of the team's kit.

The team's home kit features a majority white top with a navy collar and thin, short, dark blue streaks speckled across the entire jersey. The kit top is combined with navy shorts and white socks. The Nike logo and Big Ten logo sit on the right and left pectoral area above a Penn State wordmark logo. Featured on the right sleeve in navy is the state of Pennsylvania with a star marking the location of State College, Pennsylvania. Featured on the left sleeve in navy is the Penn State Nittany Lion athletics logo. Under Penn State's wordmark each players individual number is presented in navy. The kit was introduced during the 2019 season.

The team's away kit features a solid navy top with a white collar. The kit top is combined with navy shorts and navy socks. The Nike logo and Big Ten logo sit on the right and left pectoral area. A centered player number in white sits below the Nike and Big Ten logo.

Uniform evolution
 Primary	
	

 Secondary

Stadium

New Beaver Field (1911–1961)

New Beaver Field was a stadium in University Park, Pennsylvania. It served as the first home of Penn State's men's soccer team, hosting the team until they moved in 1960 to Beaver Stadium. The first varsity soccer home game played by Penn State took place in April 1914 at New Beaver Field when the Nittany Lions defeated the Lafayette Leopards 6–0. The team played for an enthusiastic, but small crowd.

Soccer Field (1960–1971)
Nittany Lions split time between Beaver Field and the Soccer Fields adjacent to the Ice Rink until the opening of the stadium in 1971.

Jeffrey Field (1972–present)

The Nittany Lions began play at Jeffrey Field in 1972 when the 5,000-seater stadium opened. The stadium was dedicated to the late Bill Jeffrey who was the team's head coach from 1926 until 1952 and a National Soccer Hall of Fame member. Built for the soccer and lacrosse teams, Jeffrey Field had an initial seating capacity of 2,500. Jeffrey Field was first remodeled in 1978, bleachers were added to expand the capacity to 3,500 along with fencing and a practice field. In 1996 the lights were updated prior to the season start. During the summer of 2003, Jeffrey Field again underwent a facelift. In addition to the installation of a new field surface, a press box and a video booth were also added, and the bleachers were expanded to a capacity of 5,000. Team locker rooms were added in 2013, and in August 2014 branding windscreens were installed. Jeffrey Field was honored in 2006 as the Collegiate Soccer Field of the Year by the SportsTurf Managers Association.

Supporters

The Park Avenue Army is a supporters group for Penn State men's soccer and Penn State women's soccer. The group was formed as two separate groups, Park Avenue Army and Sons of Jeffrey in 2011 and 2015 respectively. The groups were formally combined under one banner and leadership in 2019. Members occupy the northwest stand of Jeffrey Field during home matches. The group engages in many of the traditional Penn State chants including the "We Are" chant, Zombie Nation as well other American soccer chants like “I Believe That We Will Win”.

Roster

Yearly records

† Season postponed

Records

Career goals

Career assists

Honors

Notable alumni

Players
 Chris Bahr - 2× Super Bowl champion
 Matt Bahr - 2× Super Bowl champion
 Dan Canter -  U.S. national team player
 Ronald Coder - Olympian
 Randy Garber - U.S. national team player
 Ted Gillen - U.S. national team player
 Dick Packer - Olympian
 Andy Rymarczuk - U.S. national team player
 Troy Snyder - U.S. national team player
 Kenji Treschuk - USL First Division Champion
 Corey Hertzog - 13th overall in the 2011 MLS SuperDraft

Coaches
 William Jeffrey - National Soccer Hall of Fame member
 Walter Bahr - National Soccer Hall of Fame member

References

External links

 

 
Association football clubs established in 1911
1911 establishments in Pennsylvania
Soccer clubs in Pennsylvania
Amateur soccer teams in Pennsylvania